Charaxes viossati is a butterfly in the family Nymphalidae. It is found on the Comoros, an island off the eastern coast of Africa.

References

External links
Images of Charaxes viossati at Bold

Butterflies described in 1991
viossati
Endemic fauna of the Comoros